Dmytro Kulyk (born 26 January 2002) is a Ukrainian professional footballer who plays as a forward for FC Chernihiv.

Career
He started to play for Yunist Chernihiv, RVUFK KyivPiddubny Olympic College, Zorya and Kudrivka.

FC Chernihiv
On 25 August 2022 he signed for FC Chernihiv. On 27 August he made his debut in Ukrainian First League against Skoruk Tomakivka. On 23 October 2022, he scored his first goal with the new club against Hirnyk-Sport Horishni Plavni at the Yunist Stadium in Chernihiv. On 30 October 2022, he scored his second goal against Obolon Kyiv. On 12 November his scored against LNZ Cherkasy at the Cherkasy Arena in Cherkasy.

Career statistics

Club

References

External links
Profile from the Ukrainian First League

 

2002 births
Living people
Footballers from Chernihiv
FC Yunist Chernihiv players
Piddubny Olympic College alumni
FC Desna-3 Chernihiv players
FC Chernihiv players
FC Kudrivka players
Ukrainian footballers
Ukrainian First League players
Association football forwards